Solid Ether is an album by Norwegian trumpeter, composer and producer Nils Petter Molvær. It was recorded in 1999 and released on the ECM label on May 5, 2000.

Reception
On All About Jazz, Chris M. Slawecki called it "A stunning meltdown of classic jazz trumpet styles with modern techno, drum-and-bass and electronic music". The AllMusic review by David R. Adler stated "Not everyone will "get" this kind of music, and die-hard jazzers might laugh it off as an inconsequential fad. But it's actually a seismic innovation that is just getting started". Robert Christgau gave the album an A rating noting that "He immerses in chaos and comes out beautiful."

Track listing
All compositions by Nils Petter Molvær
 "Dead Indeed" – 7:30
 "Vilderness 1" – 7:48
 "Kakonita" – 4:59
 "Merciful 1" (Molvær, Sidsel Endresen) – 1:02
 "Ligotage" – 6:43
 "Trip" – 6:24
 "Vilderness 2" – 4:56
 "Tragamar" – 4:45
 "Solid Ether" – 5:12
 "Merciful 2" (Molvær, Endresen) – 1:13

Personnel
Nils Petter Molvær – trumpet, piccolo trumpet, electronic trumpet, synthesizer, bass, loops, electronics, sampler, effects, percussion, piano, synth-bass, vocoder trumpet, voice effects, beats, sound treatment
Eivind Aarset – guitar, effects (tracks 1, 2 & 5–9)
Audun Erlien – bass (tracks 2 & 5–9)
Rune Arnesen, Per Lindvall – drums (tracks 2 & 5–9) 
DJ Strangefruit – electronics, sampler, voice, scratches (tracks 5, 6, 8 & 9)
Sidsel Endresen – vocals (tracks 4 & 10)

References

2000 albums
Nils Petter Molvær albums
ECM Records albums
Albums produced by Manfred Eicher